WhoCares was a supergroup formed by Ian Gillan of Deep Purple and Tony Iommi of Black Sabbath in 2011 with the participation of a great number of rock artists as a charity project to raise money to rebuild a music school in Gyumri, Armenia, after the destruction of the city in the 1988 earthquake in Armenia. The album sold more than 20,000 copies in Europe.

Members
The supergroup WhoCares was originally made up Ian Gillan (of Deep Purple) and Tony Iommi (of Black Sabbath).

Many artists took part in the project, namely Jon Lord (of Deep Purple), Jason Newsted (of Metallica), Nicko McBrain (of Iron Maiden) and Mikko "Linde" Lindström (of HIM)

Background
The formation of the project WhoCares follows a two-decade continuous efforts by Gillan  in helping Armenia after the devastating earthquake there in north of the country. Gillan had been involved in Rock Aid Armenia following the earthquake. The documentary Picture of Home shot by Bernie Zelvis and Christina Rowatt documented Gillan's involvement with David Gilmour, Brian May, Ritchie Blackmore and Bruce Dickinson in recording "Smoke on the Water" as a charity for Armenian relief efforts.

On a return visit to Armenia to receive honorary presidential medal for their efforts, Gillan and Iommi learned about a derelict music school in Gyumri heavily affected by the earthquake. The music school was in dire need of repairs and staff, and lacked many musical instruments. Gillan and Iommi formed WhoCares to provide financing for the school and solicited help from other artists to make music as a charity for the school.

Releases
WhoCares debut single in 2011 was the 2-track release "Out of My Mind / Holy Water", a charity release that was made available digital download, on CD and as a limited 7" edition

In July–August 2012, WhoCares launched a 2-CD release Ian Gillan & Tony Iommi: WhoCares containing many classic songs, but also rarities and special tracks for the album.

Members
Ian Gillan (Deep Purple) – vocals
Tony Iommi (Black Sabbath) – guitars
Jon Lord (Deep Purple) – keyboards
Jason Newsted (Metallica) – bass
Nicko McBrain (Iron Maiden) – drums
Mikko "Linde" Lindström (HIM) – guitars

Discography

Albums

Singles

References

Musical groups established in 2011
Ian Gillan
British supergroups
Charity supergroups
Rock music supergroups
2011 establishments in the United Kingdom